It's So Funny is a type of North Korean comedy television show. These type of shows have been on the air since the 1970s, the start of state programming in North Korea, making it one of the world's longest-running television comedies, as well as a staple of North Korean television.

The show usually consists of a man and a woman in military uniform having a conversation. The two protagonists sometimes sing, dance and try slapstick, involving activities which exceed the boundaries of common sense. The show is intended to improve troop morale. Its themes are often repetitive and its humor obscure, but its propaganda content in favor of the North Korean leadership is blunt.

See also

List of North Korean television series

Notes

References

External links
A skit from the show

North Korean television shows
Television sketch shows
Propaganda television broadcasts
1970s North Korean television series
1980s North Korean television series
1990s North Korean television series
2000s North Korean television series
2010s North Korean television series